Alizadeh is a surname built from Ali (name) and the Persian suffix zada. It may refer to:

Ali Alizadeh, Iranian footballer
Ghazaleh Alizadeh, Iranian writer
Hossein Alizadeh, Iranian musician
Javad Alizadeh, Iranian cartoonist
Kimia Alizadeh, Iranian Taekwondo athlete
Safura Alizadeh, Azeri musician
Sonita Alizadeh, Afghan rapper and activist

Iranian-language surnames
Azerbaijani-language surnames
Patronymic surnames
Surnames from given names